Macarthur Football Club is an Australian professional soccer club based in South Western Sydney, New South Wales. It competes in Australia's premier soccer competition, the A-League, under licence from Australian Professional Leagues (APL). On 13 December 2018, it was announced that the club would be accepted into the A-League as part of the new expansion process.

History
The club's origins are in the merging of two separate bids during the league's expansion process in 2018, United for Macarthur and South West Sydney FC. The two entities joined forces on 20 August 2018 to create Macarthur South West United Football Club, which later that year was chosen by the FFA to join the league in the 2020–21 A-League season. Club was founded by Chairman Gino Marra and football operations Director Sam Krslovic

On 15 May 2019, the club founded by Gino Marra & Sam Krslovic announced the club's name, logo and colours. They were officially unveiled at a gala held by the club at the Campbelltown Catholic Club. The club was called Macarthur FC and nicknamed the Bulls. Also announced as their inaugural manager was Ante Milicic.

On 15 January 2020, the club announced the signing of Tommy Oar, their first ever signing.

On 18 February 2020, Lang Walker sold his 50% ownership stake in the club to a consortium of two local Sydney businessmen. Michael Gerace, who owns Sydney Trucks and Machinery, and Roy Mammone, a Sydney property developer, bought the 50% stake for an undisclosed fee in excess of $7 million. The other 50% is owned by Club Chairman Gino Marra and Sam Krslovic.

On 30 December 2020, the club played its first ever match in the A-League, recording a 1–0 victory playing away to Western Sydney Wanderers.

On 1 October 2022, Macarthur FC won the Australia Cup for the first time in their history, beating Sydney United 58 2–0 in the final. The game was played at Commbank Stadium in front of 16,461 fans.

Colours and badge
The logo depicts a black and gold ochre bull which is contained in a crest where the inner border is black and the outer gold ochre with the club's name written in the aforementioned colours above the bull and three federation stars at the bottom. The bull makes reference to the region where a runaway herd of cattle was discovered in its past. The federation stars symbolise the soccer community in Australia, the National Premier Leagues and the A-League. The logo features mainly black and white with the addition of gold ochre to highlight the Dharawal heritage of the area.

Win–loss record

Rivalries
Macarthur FC vs. Western Sydney Wanderers FC

Macarthur FC has a rivalry with the Western Sydney Wanderers. The rivalry is largely based on geography, with both teams based in Greater Western Sydney. The two clubs first met in the opening round of the 2020–21 A-League season on 30 December 2020, with Macarthur winning the match 1–0 after a goal scored by Mark Milligan. On 6 February 2021, in the following derby, Macarthur drew 2–2 at home with goals by Aleksandar Jovanovic and Aleksandar Šušnjar.

Stadium

Location

Players

First team squad

Youth

Players to have been featured in a first-team matchday squad for Macarthur FC from their National Premier Leagues NSW affiliate Northbridge FC.

Coaching staff
Football department

Honours

Domestic

Cups
Australia Cup
Winners (1): 2022

See also
 Expansion of the A-League Men

References

External links
Official website

 
Soccer clubs in Sydney
Association football clubs established in 2017
A-League Men teams
Expansion of the A-League Men
2017 establishments in Australia